The 1930–31 season was the 58th season of competitive football in Scotland and the 41st season of the Scottish Football League.

Scottish League Division One 

Champions: Rangers
Relegated: Hibernian, East Fife

Scottish League Division Two 

Promoted: Third Lanark, Dundee United

Scottish Cup 

Celtic were winners of the Scottish Cup after a 4–2 replay win over Motherwell.

Other honours

National

County 

 – aggregate over two legs

Highland League

Junior Cup 
Denny Hibs were winners of the Junior Cup after a 1–0 win over Burnbank Athletic in the final.

Scotland national team 

Scotland were joint winners with England of the 1930–31 British Home Championship.

Key:
 (H) = Home match
 (A) = Away match
 BHC = British Home Championship

References

External links 
 Scottish Football Historical Archive